Luís Marques Almeida Vieira da Silva (born 18 February 1999) is a Portuguese professional footballer who plays for Cypriot club Enosis Neon Paralimni as a defender.

Club career
Born in Oeiras, Silva came through the ranks at Benfica's youth system, becoming captain of the U16 team.
On 1 July 2015 he joined Premier League club Stoke City. He then went on to play across their U18 and U23 team.
On 21 May 2016, Silva was in the 18 man Portugal U17´s squad who became UEFA Under-17 European champions, in Baku.
On 28 December 2018, Silva made his professional debut with Belenenses in a 2018–19 Taça da Liga match against 
Porto.

On 21 July 2021, he moved to Enosis Neon Paralimni in Cyprus.

References

External links

1999 births
Living people
People from Oeiras, Portugal
Portuguese footballers
Association football defenders
C.F. Os Belenenses players
S.L. Benfica footballers
Stoke City F.C. players
Enosis Neon Paralimni FC players
Portuguese expatriate footballers
Expatriate footballers in England
Portuguese expatriate sportspeople in England
Expatriate footballers in Cyprus
Portuguese expatriate sportspeople in Cyprus
Sportspeople from Lisbon District